Xinzhou West railway station is a railway station in Xinfu District, Xinzhou, Shanxi, China. It opened with the Datong–Xi'an high-speed railway on 28 September 2018. It will be the western terminus of the planned Xiong'an–Xinzhou high-speed railway.

References

Railway stations in Shanxi
Railway stations in China opened in 2018